Hilda Smith may refer to:

Hilda Worthington Smith (1888–1984), American labor educator, social worker, and poet
Kitty Lovell-Smith (born Hilda Kate Lovell-Smith; 1886–1973), New Zealand businesswoman and community organiser
Hilda Smith (gymnast) (1909–1995), British gymnast and medalist at the 1928 Summer Olympics
Hilda Aitken (born Hilda Smith; 1891–1987), members of the colonial parliament of Bermuda